William Soares may refer to:

 William Soares (footballer, born 1985), Brazilian football centre-back
 William Soares (footballer, born 1988), Brazilian football midfielder